Dragon Challenge (known as Dueling Dragons from 1999 to 2010) was a pair of intertwined, inverted roller coasters in the Wizarding World of Harry Potter area of Universal Studios' Islands of Adventure in Orlando, Florida, United States. The ride was themed to two chasing dragons, one side being a Chinese Fireball and the other a Hungarian Horntail. It featured a layout in which the two trains shared adjacent lift hills but traversed two unique courses. The ride was designed by Bolliger & Mabillard of Switzerland. The Chinese Fireball reached a top speed of 60 mph, and the Hungarian Horntail reached a top speed of 55 mph. Both versions featured five inversions and a total ride time of 2 minutes and 25 seconds.

When Islands of Adventure opened on May 28, 1999, the ride was called Dueling Dragons and was located in The Lost Continent area with the two trains named Fire and Ice. After a renovation period, the attraction reopened in mid-March 2010, and was officially renamed as Dragon Challenge with The Wizarding World of Harry Potter grand opening on June 18, 2010. During much of the ride's history, the trains were dispatched simultaneously, creating three near-miss encounters along the courses. However, after two injuries related to loose objects hitting riders on the other coaster, the roller coasters were dispatched separately.

In July 2017, Universal Orlando officials announced that Dragon Challenge would close on September 4, 2017. The coasters had reached the end of their service life, and the park demolished the two coasters to make way for a new attraction, Hagrid's Magical Creatures Motorbike Adventure, which opened on June 13, 2019.

History

Dueling Dragons (1999–2010)

In 1997, it was announced that Dueling Dragons would be a part of a new second theme park at the Universal Orlando Resort, Islands of Adventure. The new ride would be a unique dueling inverted roller coaster by Bolliger & Mabillard. It would be placed in a fairy tale-themed land known as the Lost Continent. The coaster would be situated in the Merlinwood area. Dueling Dragons was completed on time for the opening of Islands of Adventure on May 28, 1999. At the time, it was the only fully inverted dueling roller coaster in the world. The ride was themed to two dueling dragons. The queue was decorated as a ruined castle that the two dragons destroyed. Once the riders arrived at the station, they chose which of the two coasters they would like to experience, the Fire dragon or the Ice dragon. The original name for Dueling Dragons was going to be "Merlin's Dueling Dragons," and the dragons both had names; Blizzrock for the blue dragon, and Pyrock for the red dragon.

Dragon Challenge (2010–2017)
On May 31, 2007, Universal announced plans to construct The Wizarding World of Harry Potter, a new section devoted to the popular Harry Potter book and film series. Dueling Dragons, as well as the adjacent roller coaster Flying Unicorn (later renamed Flight of the Hippogriff), were shown to be included in the new section. Universal later announced that Dueling Dragons would be renamed Dragon Challenge upon the re-opening of the attraction and that its two coasters would be renamed Hungarian Horntail and Chinese Fireball.

Construction on re-theming the queue began in the third quarter of 2009. In the first quarter of 2010, the ride closed in order to refurbish the attraction to incorporate the Harry Potter theme. In mid-March 2010, the roller coasters reopened to the public. On June 18, 2010, with the opening of the entire The Wizarding World of Harry Potter section, the ride officially became Dragon Challenge.

During the summer of 2011, there were two accidents (one serious) caused by what is believed to be loose objects hitting riders while riding the roller coaster. The most serious accident involved a rider being struck in the eye by an object, causing injuries which required the removal of the eye. On the same day of the incident, Universal Studios announced that the coasters would not duel until an investigation was completed. For two months the coasters were dispatched separately and in mid-October 2011, Universal made the decision to turn off the dueling aspect of the ride permanently without any explanation to what caused the injuries. No further injuries were reported.

Dragon Challenge was becoming obsolete due to the lack of its dueling feature. In early 2017, rumors were starting to spread that it was to be removed for a new attraction based on the Harry Potter spin-off film Fantastic Beasts and Where to Find Them. It was then confirmed that Universal announced on July 24, 2017, that a new roller coaster was scheduled to debut in 2019, meaning that Dragon Challenge would be officially shut down on September 4, 2017. By late September 2017, Dragon Challenge was being removed and sent to the scrapyard. The ride's replacement, Hagrid's Magical Creatures Motorbike Adventure, opened on June 13, 2019.

A tribute to Dragon Challenge can be found in the queue line. Upon exiting the room with cages on the ceiling, guests can find a mural on the left wall. The mural features fire and ice dragons and a message saying Dueling Club.

Ride experience

Queue
Before the Harry Potter refurbishment, the queue was themed as a ruined castle where the Fire and Ice dragons lived. The queue passed through dungeons with human skeletons, torches and cobwebs. To ride Fire, guests would go left, while riders wanting to ride Ice would go right at the intersection point.

After the Harry Potter re-theming of the queue, guests were taken past a number of banners for the Triwizard Tournament showing support for the tournament's four contestants. After passing the Weasleys' crashed flying Ford Anglia, they entered the Champions' Tent. From there, guests passed a large pedestal with the Triwizard Cup glowing at the top, and several dark "tunnels" which led to both coaster's stations. Just before entering the station, guests had to choose which coaster they wanted to ride: the Chinese Fireball to the left or the Hungarian Horntail to the right. Once in the station, there was a projection of the dragons on the ceiling.

In April 2015, metal detectors were installed as a permanent fixture to the entrance, and security officers with metal-detecting wands were employed. The attraction enacted a zero tolerance policy for cell phones, wallets, coins, watches, cameras, or other loose objects; all riders were required to  completely empty their pockets before boarding. Persons in violation would be sent to the lockers or possibly ejected from the park without a refund.

Track layout

Chinese Fireball

After departing from the station, the train made a slight left turn leading into the transfer track section before beginning to climb the  lift hill. Once at the top and after going through a pre-drop, the train made a sharp  left-hand drop back to the ground. Then, the train went back up, through an Immelmann followed by a slight air-time downward right turn before entering an air-time hill (this was the first of three near-miss points with the Hungarian Horntail train when the roller coasters duelled). Next, the train dropped back down turning left slightly, leading into a second Immelmann. After a downward right helix and a short section of straight track, the train went through the second former near-miss point with the other train, a vertical loop. After the loop and another section of straight track, the train made a right turn leading into the third and final former near-miss element, which was a corkscrew. Then, the train made a left turn followed by a small drop leading into another section of straight track before entering the final element in the coaster layout, another corkscrew. The train then made a left turn into the final brake run. Following a left turn, the train returned to the station where the riders unloaded and the next riders loaded.

Hungarian Horntail
After departing from the station, the train made a slight right turn leading into the transfer track section before beginning to climb the  lift hill. Once at the top and after going through a pre-drop, the train made a sharp  right-hand drop back to the ground. Then, the train went through a 270-degree left overbanked turn before entering a Zero-gravity roll, which was the first of three former near-miss points with the Chinese Fireball train. Then, the train made a slight right turn heading straight into a wall before entering a cobra roll. After a straight section of track, the train entered the second former near-miss point with the other train, a vertical loop. The train then made a right turn into the final former near-miss point, a corkscrew. Next, the train made a right turn, followed by a left turn leading into the final brake run. Following a right turn, the train returned to the station where the riders unloaded and the next riders loaded.

Track
Chinese Fireball's track was red, Hungarian Horntail's was blue, and both coasters' supports were white.

Trains
Dragon Challenge operated with several steel and fiberglass trains. Each train had eight cars with four seats for a total of 32 riders per train. The trains' front seat resembled a mouth, while the rest bore a resemblance to hands. The Hungarian Horntail trains resembled a blue ice dragon while the Chinese Fireball trains resembled a red fire dragon.

When the coaster cars duelled, in order to make the trains meet at each of the three near-miss points along the layout, the trains would be weighed once they were loaded at the station to adjust the dispatch times. (For example, if the Chinese Fireball train weighed more than the Hungarian Horntail train, the Fireball would be dispatched after the Horntail.)

Reception
Dragon Challenge was generally well received from its opening in 1999 until its closing in 2017. In Amusement Today annual Golden Ticket Awards for the Top Steel Roller Coasters, Dragon Challenge ranked in the top 50 every year between 2000 and 2012. It peaked at position 11 in 2002.

Incidents
 On July 1, 2009, an employee was walking underneath the coaster in a restricted area when he was hit by a train during a test run. The victim suffered multiple head injuries and was taken to nearby Orlando Regional Medical Center and then later died.
 On July 31, 2011, a tourist was injured when an unidentified object hit him in the eye while riding Dragon Challenge. Prior to the incident, the guest had only one good eye, therefore the incident resulted in the guest completely losing his sight. Dragon Challenge remained shut for less than 24 hours after the incident with Universal concluding that the ride was safe.
On August 10, 2011, a rider was struck by an object while riding the attraction, injuring his face and leg. As a result of this and the aforementioned incident in which a rider lost sight in one eye, Universal officials announced that the two roller coasters would no longer operate simultaneously, pending an investigation into both incidents. In October 2011, officials suspended the dueling aspect of the ride permanently.

See also
Incidents at Universal parks

References

External links
Dragon Challenge at Universal Orlando Resort
 

1999 establishments in Florida
2017 disestablishments in Florida
Amusement rides based on film franchises
Former roller coasters in Florida
Former Warner Bros. Global Brands and Experiences attractions
Harry Potter in amusement parks
Inverted roller coasters manufactured by Bolliger & Mabillard
Islands of Adventure
Licensed properties at Universal Parks & Resorts
Roller coasters in Orlando, Florida
Roller coasters introduced in 1999
Roller coasters introduced in 2010
Roller coasters operated by Universal Parks & Resorts
Universal Parks & Resorts attractions by name